Jeffrey C. "Jeff" McKay is an American politician who serves as Chairman of the Fairfax County Board of Supervisors in Northern Virginia. He first won election to the board in November 2007, representing  the Lee district, which includes the Springfield and Franconia areas. In 2019, he was elected as chairman, taking office in January 2020 and succeeding longtime Chairwoman Sharon Bulova.

Education 
McKay attended Bishop Ireton High School, a private Roman Catholic high school in Alexandria, Virginia . He graduated from James Madison University in December 1996 with a bachelor's degree. He had served as president of the college Young Democrats during his sophomore and senior years, and as Chair of the Virginia Young Democrats College Caucus. In 1998, McKay graduated from the University of Virginia’s Sorensen Institute for Political Leadership.

Career 
Shortly after graduating from JMU in 1996, McKay was hired to serve as Chief of Staff to Lee District Supervisor Dana Kauffman. He continued in that position for more than a decade, until Kauffman retired in 2007 and he successfully ran in the November election to succeed him. Following his time as Lee District Supervisor, McKay was elected countywide in 2019 to serve as Chairman of the Fairfax County Board of Supervisors.

Since joining the Board, McKay co-created Fairfax County's award winning One Fairfax resolution and policy, the first of its kind in Virginia. The policy was adopted by the Fairfax County School Board as well. Reflecting on his upbringing on the Richmond Highway Corridor, McKay led the discussion and analysis of inequities that exist in Fairfax County. The One Fairfax policy has been instrumental in implementing equity reviews of County actions and has been mirrored by jurisdictions through the region and state.  

McKay has also been a strong supporter of expanding funding to education, which receives over half of Fairfax County's budget, and the Diversion First program, which directs people away from jail and into mental health treatment. McKay has worked hard to expand benefits for employees, including six week of paid family leave and entering into the county's first collective bargaining agreement with unions. As Chairman, McKay has also been a champion for increasing and preserving the county's affordable housing stock and reducing its carbon footprint and waste. McKay is also a regional leader. Currently, he is Chair of the Dulles Corridor Advisory Committee and serves on the Northern Virginia Transportation Authority, Northern Virginia Transportation Commission (NVTC), the Metropolitan Washington Council of Governments, and on the board of directors for the Virginia Association of Counties where he is the immediate past president. In addition, he was twice the Chair of NVTC and a member of the Northern Virginia Regional Commission. McKay's work has been recognized by the Mount Vernon Lee Chamber of Commerce as Citizen of the Year in 2019, by the Faith Alliance for Climate Solutions as the recipient of the 2020 Sustainability Champion Legacy Award, and by the Fairfax County Park Authority Board as the recipient of the 2021 Chairman's Choice Award.

During the COVID-19 pandemic, Chairman McKay supported Fairfax County's mass testing, vaccination equity clinics, quarantine and isolation sites and the evictions task force, while leading efforts to inform the county's 1.2 million residents. He established the Chairman’s Task Force on Equity and Opportunity to evaluate systems that have made places and populations vulnerable, lift voices that need to be heard and take actions to reshape the county where all individuals can thrive. Under his leadership, the county has allocated millions of dollars toward rental and food assistance, healthcare, small business grants, community outreach and more. As Chairman of the Board of Supervisors, he is leading the charge to ensure that Fairfax County residents vaccinate as many people as possible and supporting a path of equitable economic recovery.

McKay was investigated by the Virginia State Police in 2019. The investigation considered whether McKay's purchase of his family home from a developer friend for $850,000 in 2017 was an undisclosed gift, which would have been a misdemeanor. McKay denied malfeasance, and was later cleared of any wrongdoing.

Personal life 

McKay is a lifelong Fairfax County resident, born and raised on the historic Route One Corridor in Lee District. McKay married Crystal Newsome in 2005. They have two children, Leann and Aidan.

Electoral History

References

External links
Washington Post bio
Fairfax County Supervisor bio

Living people
Virginia Democrats
James Madison University alumni
Members of the Fairfax County Board of Supervisors
21st-century American politicians
1975 births